Elly Ney (27 September 1882 – 31 March 1968) was a German romantic pianist who specialized in Beethoven, and was especially popular in Germany.

Career 
She was born in Düsseldorf, where her mother was a music instructor and her father was a registrar. Her grandmother introduced her to the works of Beethoven, and supported her piano playing. She studied at Cologne with Isidor Seiss and Karl Bötcher. After winning the Mendelssohn Scholarship in 1901, she studied in Vienna with Theodor Leschetizky, with whom she only had two lessons, and Emil von Sauer. She taught at the Cologne Conservatory for three years, then became a touring virtuoso. In 1927 she was given the honorary freedom of Beethoven's birthplace Bonn. In 1932 she founded the Elly Ney Trio with Wilhelm Stross (violin) and Ludwig Hoelscher (cello): in quintets the group recorded with Florizel von Reuter (violin) and Walter Trampler (viola). She traveled to many parts of the world, including the USA, playing in Carnegie Hall in New York City.

Nazi links
During the Third Reich she joined the Nazi Party in 1937, participated in "cultural education" camps, and became an honorary member of the League of German Girls. She recited quotations from Hitler between performances of Beethoven sonatas and honored the composer's bust with a Hitler salute. She held antisemitic views: in 1933, Ney refused to perform in Hamburg after she was asked to replace a Jewish pianist (Rudolf Serkin), although she did record at least one Mendelssohn Song without Words in 1960 or shortly afterward. Ney was awarded the War Merit Cross, 2nd Class for care for troops. After the war, the city of Bonn imposed a stage ban on her. In 1952 a request for lifting the ban was rejected, stating that Ney was a "pronounced National Socialist". Nevertheless, after finally renouncing Hitler a full seven years after the end of WWII, she was named Honorary Citizen of Tutzing in 1952. However, her Nazism was too embarrassing, and they stripped her of that status after her death in 1968.

Personal

Elly Ney was married twice; first, in 1911, to the Dutch conductor Willem van Hoogstraten. They had one daughter, Eleonore (1918–2007). They divorced in 1927 and she married Paul Allais, an American coal dealer from Chicago. This marriage didn't last long, and later on Ney reconciled with van Hoogstraten.

Ney died in Tutzing in 1968 aged 85.

References

External links

amica.org
deutsche-biographie.de

1882 births
1968 deaths
Musicians from Düsseldorf
German classical pianists
German women pianists
Mendelssohn Prize winners
Nazi Party members
20th-century classical pianists
Women classical pianists
20th-century German women
20th-century women pianists